Longtown is a census-designated place (CDP) and unincorporated community in Pittsburg County, Oklahoma, United States. The population was 2,397 at the 2000 census.

History 
At the time of its founding, Longtown was located in Tobucksy County, Choctaw Nation, in the Indian Territory.  Longtown Creek formed the boundary between Tobucksy and Gaines County.

Geography
Longtown is located at  (35.229636, -95.520191).

Demographics

As of the census of 2000, there were 2,397 people, 1,101 households, and 778 families residing in the CDP. The population density was 90.4 people per square mile (34.9/km2). There were 3,059 housing units at an average density of 115.3/sq mi (44.5/km2). The racial makeup of the CDP was 88.36% White, 0.13% African American, 7.76% Native American, 0.04% Asian, 0.17% from other races, and 3.55% from two or more races. Hispanic or Latino of any race were 0.83% of the population.

There were 1,101 households, out of which 17.7% had children under the age of 18 living with them, 61.9% were married couples living together, 5.9% had a female householder with no husband present, and 29.3% were non-families. 26.2% of all households were made up of individuals, and 11.7% had someone living alone who was 65 years of age or older. The average household size was 2.18 and the average family size was 2.57.

In the CDP, the population was spread out, with 16.8% under the age of 18, 3.9% from 18 to 24, 19.0% from 25 to 44, 35.6% from 45 to 64, and 24.7% who were 65 years of age or older. The median age was 52 years. For every 100 females, there were 103.1 males. For every 100 females age 18 and over, there were 98.3 males.

The median income for a household in the CDP was $26,813, and the median income for a family was $33,060. Males had a median income of $29,625 versus $19,737 for females. The per capita income for the CDP was $15,722. About 12.4% of families and 13.7% of the population were below the poverty line, including 13.9% of those under age 18 and 10.8% of those age 65 or over.

References

Census-designated places in Pittsburg County, Oklahoma
Census-designated places in Oklahoma